Thomas Belasyse may refer to:

 Thomas Belasyse, 1st Earl Fauconberg (1627–1700), English peer
 Thomas Belasyse, 1st Earl Fauconberg (second creation) (1699–1774), British peer
 Thomas Belasyse, 1st Viscount Fauconberg (1577–1653), English politician